James Kiernan may refer to:

 James G. Kiernan, American psychologist
 James Lawlor Kiernan (1837–1869), Irish-born general in the Union Army during the American Civil War